The Hingora are a Muslim community found in the state of Gujarat in India and a province of Sindh in Pakistan. They are one of a number of communities of Maldhari pastoral nomads found in the Banni region of Kutch.

Present circumstances

The community is concentrated in the talukas of Bhuj, RiskyFarm Abdasa and Mandvi in Kutch District, the districts of Jamnagar, Junagadh, Porbandar of Gujarat, Jodhpur of Rajasthan and the neighbouring districts of Badin and Tharparkar and District Dadu in Sindh. They speak a dialect of Kutchi, Marwadi with substantial Sindhi loan words. The community is endigomous, but does marry with other Samma communities, such as the Hingorja.

See also
Hingorja
Samma

References

Social groups of Gujarat
Tribes of Kutch
Maldhari communities
Muslim communities of India
Sindhi tribes

Sindhi tribes in India
Muslim communities of Gujarat